Ralfs Grīnbergs (born 10 November 1995) is a Latvian ice hockey player currently playing for the HK Rīga of the MHL.

Playing career
Grīnbergs began his hockey career playing in minor and junior Latvian hockey leagues. In 2013/2014 season he joined HK Rīga Dinamo Rīga minor league affiliate. He made his KHL debut on 15 October in defeat against Jokerit.

International
Grīnbergs participated at the 2014 World Junior Ice Hockey Championships as a member of the Latvia men's national junior ice hockey team.

References

External links

1995 births
Living people
Latvian ice hockey defencemen
HK Riga players
Dinamo Riga players
Mississippi RiverKings (SPHL) players
21st-century Latvian people